Blue River Reservoir is an artificial impoundment, about  long, of the Blue River in Lane County in the U.S. state of Oregon.

Despite frequent blooms of blue-green algae, the lake is heavily used for recreation. Trout are the principal fish, supplemented from local hatcheries.

Recreation
Blue River Reservoir is used for fishing, boating, swimming, and waterskiing. The United States Forest Service manages Mona Campground, on the north side of the reservoir, and Lookout Campground, on the northeast side. The Forest Service also manages two launching sites for motorized and non-motorized boats, one near Lookout Campground and the other near Saddle Dam on the south shore. The reservoir supports populations of native coastal cutthroat trout and stocked rainbow trout.

See also
 List of lakes in Oregon

References

External links
 
 McKenzie Watershed Council
 Photo of the reservoir at sunset by Chris Ten Eyck

Reservoirs in Oregon
Willamette National Forest
1968 establishments in Oregon